This is a list of research centres and institutes of the Royal Melbourne Institute of Technology (RMIT) located at the campuses of its Australian (RMIT University) and Vietnamese (RMIT University Vietnam) branches, its European centre and partner sites.

Centres, institutes and laboratories
Australian Asia-Pacific Economic Cooperation (APEC) Study Centre
Melbourne APEC Finance Centre
Australian Centre for Human Rights Education (ACHRE)
Australian Film Institute (AFI) Research Collection
European Union (EU) Centre at RMIT
International Centre for Environmental and Bioethics
International Centre for Graphic Technology
Nautilus at RMIT
RMIT Advanced Manufacturing Precinct
RMIT Applied and Nutritional Toxicology Key Centre
RMIT Biosignals Laboratory
RMIT Blockchain Innovation Hub
RMIT Centre for Additive Manufacturing
RMIT Centre for Advanced Electronics and Sensors
RMIT Centre for Advanced Materials and Industrial Chemistry (CAMIC)
RMIT Centre for Advanced Materials and Performance Textiles (CAMPT)
RMIT Centre for Animation and Interactive Media
RMIT Centre for Applied Social Research (CASR)
RMIT Centre for Art, Society and Transformation (CAST)
RMIT Centre for Communication, Politics and Culture
RMIT Centre for Construction Work Health and Safety Research
RMIT Centre for Design Practice Research (d_Lab)
Ethical Design Laboratory
 RMIT Centre for Game Design Research 
Virtual Experiences Laboratory (VXLab)
RMIT Centre for Global Research
RMIT Centre for Education, Training and Work in the Asian Century
RMIT Centre for Environmental Sustainability and Remediation (EnSuRe)
RMIT Centre for Innovative Justice
RMIT Centre for Innovative Structures and Materials
RMIT Centre for Integrated Project Solutions
RMIT Centre for Molecular and Nanoscale Physics (nanoPHYS)
RMIT Centre for Risk and Community Safety
RMIT Centre for People, Organisations and Work
RMIT Centre for Urban Research
RMIT Computational Fluid Dynamics Laboratory
RMIT Communication Technologies Research Centre
RMIT Design Archives 
RMIT Digital Ethnography Research Centre (DERC)
RMIT Food Research and Innovation Centre
RMIT Games and Experimental Entertainment Laboratory (GEElab)
Exertion Games Laboratory
RMIT Green Engines Research Facility
RMIT Microelectronics and Materials Technology Centre
RMIT Micro/Nanomedical Research Centre
Micro/Nano Research Facility
RMIT Microscopy and Microanalysis Facility
RMIT Nuclear Magnetic Resonance Spectroscopy Facility
RMIT Platform Technologies Research Institute
RMIT Rheology and Materials Processing Centre
Rheology and Materials Characterisation Laboratory
RMIT Satellite Positioning for Atmosphere, Climate and Environment (SPACE) Research Centre
RMIT Separation Science and Mass Spectrometry Facility
RMIT Spatial Information Architecture Laboratory (SIAL)
SIAL Sound Studios
RMIT Science, Health and Engineering Educational Research (SHEER) Centre
RMIT Textile Design Specialist Centre
RMIT Vibrational Spectroscopy Facility
RMIT Vietnam Centre for Commerce and Management
RMIT Vietnam Centre for Communication and Design
RMIT Vietnam Centre for Technology
RMIT Virtual Reality Centre
RMIT Water: Effective Technologies and Tools (WETT) Research Centre
Sir Lawrence Wackett Aerospace Centre
Victorian X-Ray Structural Determination and Materials Characterisation Facility

Co-operative research partnerships
Australian Research Council (ARC) Centre of Excellence for Creative Industries and Innovation
ARC Centre for Complex Systems (ACCS), 2004–2009
ARC Centre of Australian Biodiversity and Heritage (CABAH), 2017–
ARC Centre of Excellence for All-Sky Astrophysics (CAASTRO), 2011–2018
ARC Centre of Excellence for Creative Industries and Innovation (CCI), 2005–2013
ARC Centre of Excellence for Environmental Decisions (CEED)
ARC Centre of Excellence for the History of Emotions (CHE), 2011–
ARC Centre of Excellence for Nanoscale BioPhotonics
ARC Centre of Excellence for Ultrahigh-bandwidth Devices for Optical Systems (CUDOS)
ARC Centre of Excellence in Population Ageing Research (CEPAR), 2011–
ARC Centre of Excellence in Future Low-Energy Electronics Technologies (FLEET), 2017–
Australian Centre for Electromagnetic Bioeffects Research
Australian Centre for Financial Studies
Australian Defence Materials Technology Centre
Australian Housing and Urban Research Institute (AHURI)
Australia-India Research Centre for Automation Software Engineering (AICAUSE)
China-Australia International Research Centre for Chinese Medicines (CAIRCCM)
Confucius Institute for Chinese Medicines
Cooperative Research Centre (CRC) for Advanced Automotive Technology
CRC for Advanced Composite Structures
CRC for Advanced Manufacturing
CRC for Bushfire and Natural Hazards
CRC for Cast Metals Manufacturing
CRC for Energy Pipelines
CRC for Smart Services
CRC for Space Environment Management
CRC for Spatial Information
CRC for Wound Management Innovation
 European Union (EU) Pattern Analysis, Statistical Modelling and Computational Learning (PASCAL) International Observatory
Indian Institute of Chemical Technology (IICT)-RMIT Research Centre
Victorian Centre for Climate Change Adaptation Research
World Health Organization (WHO) Collaborating Centre for Traditional Medicine

References

External links
RMIT research website

RMIT University
Royal Melbourne Institute of Technology
Royal Melbourne Institute of Technology
Royal Melbourne Institute of Technology
Royal Melbourne Institute of Technology
research centres and institutes of the Royal Melbourne Institute of Technology